Siri Sunde (born 15 May 1958) is a Norwegian priest. She was the first open lesbian priest who entered into a registered partnership and retained her position in the Church of Norway.

References

1958 births
20th-century Norwegian Lutheran clergy
Living people
LGBT Lutheran clergy
Norwegian lesbians
Women Lutheran clergy
21st-century Norwegian Lutheran clergy